The 2000 Havant Borough Council election took place on 4 May 2000 to elect members of Havant Borough Council in Hampshire, England. One third of the council was up for election and the council stayed under no overall control.

After the election, the composition of the council was:
Conservative 20
Labour 11
Liberal Democrats 8
Independent 3

Election result
Overall turnout at the election was 26.5%.

Ward results

By-elections between 2000 and 2002

Hart Plain

St Faiths

References

2000 English local elections
Havant Borough Council elections
2000s in Hampshire